This is a categorised list of places in Powys, Wales.

Administrative divisions

Electoral wards

Communities

Notable places

Principal towns
Brecon
Builth Wells
Llandrindod Wells
Newtown
Presteigne

Archaeological sites
Brecon Caer Roman Fort
Tretower Castle
Dolforwyn Castle
Aberedw Castle

Geographical

Geographical regions
Black Mountains
Brecon Beacons National Park
Cambrian Mountains
Elan Valley
Radnor Forest

Cave systems
Ogof Draenen
Ogof Ffynnon Ddu
Agen Allwedd
Ogof y Daren Cilau
Ogof Craig a Ffynnon

Lakes and reservoirs
Elan Valley Reservoirs
Claerwen Reservoir
Craig-goch Reservoir
Penygarreg Reservoir
Garreg-ddu Reservoir
Caban-coch Reservoir
Talybont Reservoir
Lake Vyrnwy

Rivers and waterways
Afon Claerwen
Afon Elan
Afon Irfon
Afon Ithon
Afon Llynfi
Afon Marteg
Afon Vyrwny
Clywedog Brook
River Wye
River Lugg
River Loughor
River Severn
River Tywi
River Usk

Transport

Major roads
A40 road
A44 road
A470 road
A483 road
A489 road

Railway lines
Heart of Wales Line
Welshpool and Llanfair Light Railway

Railway stations
Sugar Loaf railway station
Llanwrtyd railway station
Llangammarch railway station
Garth railway station
Cilmeri railway station
Builth Road railway station
Llandrindod railway station
Pen-y-Bont railway station
Dolau railway station
Llanbister Road railway station
Llangynllo railway station
Knighton railway station
Newtown railway station
Caersws
Welshpool
Machynlleth

Cycle routes
Powys has a number of designated cycle routes which are part of the National Cycle Network.

 Taff Trail
 Lake Vyrnwy road circuit
 Lôn Las Cymru
 Lon Cambria
 Radnor Ring
 Elan Valley Trail
 Celtic Trail, incorporating, within Powys:
 National Cycle Route 42
 National Cycle Route 43 (not yet completed)

Proposed routes include:
 National Cycle Route 83
 National Cycle Route 85
 National Cycle Route 49
 National Cycle Route 819

Footpaths
Glyndŵr's Way
Offa's Dyke Path
Wye Valley Walk

Cultural venues

Sport
Sports stadiums with seating capacity
Recreation Ground (Caersws) (3,500)
Latham Park, Newtown (5,000)
Maesydre, Welshpool (3,000)	
Llansantffraid Recreation Field (2,000)
Y Weirglodd, Rhayader (2,000)

Historical venues
Gregynog, hosts an annual music festival

See also
List of places in Powys for a list of towns and villages

 
Powys